Blue and Gray is the thirteenth studio album by the American country rock band Poco, released in 1981. The album is a theme-based record, similar to Desperado by The Eagles, only the theme on this record is the American Civil War. The band scored minor chart success with "Widowmaker". The colors in the title refer to United States Army and Confederate States Army uniforms of the period, respectively.

Reception

In his Allmusic review, music critic Bruce Eder wrote, "this isn't a bad album, and at least benefits from more energy and ambition than its immediate predecessor, Under the Gun. There's some fine playing throughout and generally good singing, and some of the writing is inspired, although there are some lapses into lightweight, unmemorable fare also. A little more consistency might have lofted this album to the level of the band's best recent work, but it's still worth hearing as one of the more ambitious records ever to come from this long-lived country-rock band—and it certainly didn't deserve the obscurity that enveloped it."

Track listing
"Glorybound" (Rusty Young) – 3:35
"Blue and Gray" (Young) – 4:40
"Streets of Paradise" (Paul Cotton) – 3:55
"The Writing on the Wall" (Young) – 3:10
"Down on the River Again" (Cotton) – 3:45
"Please Wait for Me" (Cotton) – 4:30
"Widowmaker" (Young) – 4:25
"Here Comes That Girl Again" (Young) – 3:15
"Sometimes (We Are All We Got)" (Cotton) – 3:35
"The Land of Glory" (Young) – 3:35

Personnel 

Poco
 Kim Bullard – keyboards, backing vocals (1, 5, 6, 8, 9)
 Paul Cotton – electric guitar (1, 2, 4, 6, 8, 9, 10), backing vocals (1, 4, 7, 8), lead vocals (2, 3, 5, 6, 9), acoustic guitar (3, 5), lead guitar (7)
 Rusty Young – acoustic guitar (1, 2, 4, 8, 9), lead vocals (1, 2, 4, 7, 8, 10), electric guitar (3, 7, 10), backing vocals (3, 6, 9), dobro (5), mandolin (5, 6), banjo (9)
 Charlie Harrison – bass, backing vocals (1-9)
 Steve Chapman – drums

Additional musicians
 Steve Forman – percussion (1-4, 6, 7, 8, 10)
 Denise Decaro – backing vocals (7, 10)
 Venetta Fields – backing vocals (7, 10)
 Clydie King – backing vocals (7, 10)

Production 
 Mike Flicker – producer, engineer 
 Joe Chiccarelli – engineer 
 David Marquette – engineer, assistant engineer 
 John Mills – engineer, mixing 
 Mitch Gibson – assistant engineer 
 Mike Reese – mastering 
 Dennis Jones – studio coordinator 
 Lew Llewellyn – studio coordinator
 George Osaki – art direction 
 Michael Kevin Lee – album design 
 Gribbitt! – design studio 
 Peter Golden – management 
 Bill Siddons – management
 Crosslight Management Ltd. – management company 
 Recorded and Mixed at Soundcastle (Hollywood, California).
 Mastered at The Mastering Lab (Hollywood, California).

References

Poco albums
1981 albums
Albums produced by Mike Flicker
MCA Records albums